Cristina Mauri (born April 1969) is an Italian figure skating coach and former competitor in ladies' singles. She is the 1993 Italian national champion and competed in the final segment at two ISU Championships.

Personal life 
Mauri was born in 1969. She married her husband in August 1993. She is the mother of Italian ice dancer Jasmine Tessari.

Her sister, Patrizia, is a skating coach.

Career 
In the 1992–93 season, Mauri won the Italian national title and was selected to represent Italy at two ISU Championships. She qualified to the final segment at both, finishing 20th at the 1993 European Championships in Helsinki, Finland, and 21st at the 1993 World Championships in Prague, Czech Republic.

Mauri retired from competition in 1993 and began working as a skating coach at Forum di Assago in September of the same year. She has coached the following skaters:

 Singles
 Stefania Berton
 Alice Garlisi
 Valentina Marchei, for 13 years.
 Elettra Maria Olivotto, from September 2016.
 Francesca Rio
 Maurizio Zandron

 Pairs
 Alessandra Cernuschi / Filippo Ambrosini
 Nicole Della Monica / Matteo Guarise

Competitive highlights

References 

1969 births
Italian female single skaters
Italian figure skating coaches
Living people
Figure skaters from Milan
20th-century Italian women
21st-century Italian women